[[File:Madonna and Child Enthroned with Angels MET DT242200.jpg|thumb|Madonna and Child Enthroned with Angels at Metropolitan Museum of Art, New York City.]]
The Master of Varlungo was an Italian painter active in a Gothic style around Florence between 1285 and 1310.

No documentation exists about the painter; his name is attached to pictures dating from the last two decades of the thirteenth century. His central work is a fragmentary Madonna and Child still located in the church of San Pietro a Varlungo, Florence. On a stylistic basis, he was assigned by Roberto Longhi in 1948 as a principal pupil of Cimabue, and as influenced by Giotto. A panel at the Metropolitan Museum of Art in New York, depicting a Madonna and Child Enthroned with Angels'' has been attributed to this painter.

References

13th-century births
Year of death unknown
14th-century Italian painters
Varlungo Master
Painters from Florence